The 1996 Maple Leaf Canadian Junior Curling Championships, the men's and women's national junior curling championships of Canada, were held February 3 to 11 at the Shamrock and Granite Curling Clubs in Edmonton, Alberta. The 1996 event was the first to be sponsored by Maple Leaf Foods.

In their first season together, the Jeff Currie rink, representing Northern Ontario won the men's event, defeating future Olympic champion Ryan Fry and his team from Manitoba in the final. The team went on to represent Canada at the 1996 World Junior Curling Championships in Red Deer, where they finished fourth. It was Northern Ontario's fourth junior men's title.

The women's side was won by the Heather Godberson (now Nedohin) rink from Alberta. Team Alberta would defeat Saskatchewan, skipped by Cindy Street in the final. At the 1996 Worlds, Godberson led team Canada to a gold medal performance. Alberta's win was the fifth women's junior championship for that province.

Men's
The men's field included future Olympic champions Ryan Fry (Manitoba) and Brad Gushue (Newfoundland) as well as future Brier champion Jean-Michel Ménard (Quebec).

Teams

Standings

Results

Draw 1

Draw 2

Draw 3

Draw 4

Draw 5

Draw 6

Draw 7

Draw 8

Draw 9

Draw 10

Draw 11

Draw 12

Draw 13

Tiebreakers

Tiebreaker #1

Tiebreaker #2

Playoffs

Semifinal

Final

Women's
The women's field included future Olympic silver medalist Kristie Moore (second for Alberta), future world champion Jeanna Richard (British Columbia) and future Scotties champion Heather Godberson (Alberta).

Teams

Standings

Results

Draw 1

Draw 2

Draw 3

Draw 4

Draw 5

Draw 6

Draw 7

Draw 8

Draw 9

Draw 10

Draw 11

Draw 12

Draw 13

Tiebreakers

Tiebreaker #1

Tiebreaker #2

Playoffs

Semifinal

Final

Qualification

Ontario
The Teranet Ontario Junior Curling Championships were held in Newmarket, with the finals on January 14. 

Denna Schell of Cannington won the women's event over Milton's Kirsten Harmark in the final, 5-4. In the men's final, Pat Ferris of Sutton defeated the Ottawa Curling Club's Ray Busato, 5-4.

External links
Men's statistics
Women's statistics

References

Canadian Junior Curling Championships
Curling competitions in Edmonton
Canadian Junior Curling Championships
Canadian Junior Curling
February 1996 sports events in Canada